Harry Robert McCluskey (March 29, 1892 – June 7, 1962) was a pitcher in Major League Baseball. He played for the Cincinnati Reds, making only three appearances during July and August of the 1915 season during his brief career.

References

External links

1892 births
1962 deaths
Major League Baseball pitchers
Cincinnati Reds players
Springfield Reapers players
Baseball players from Ohio
Findlay Browns players